Dean Andrew Cosker (born 7 January 1978) is an English former cricketer. He is a right-handed batsman and a left-arm slow bowler who played for Glamorgan. He has played in first-class, List A and Twenty20 cricket. He attended Millfield School in Somerset between 1991 and 1996.

He made his first-class debut in 1996 against Lancashire at Cardiff taking 6 wickets in the match. Soon after Cosker toured with England Under-19 cricket team in their tour of Pakistan.

In 1997 he was given a longer run in the Glamorgan side as Robert Croft was playing for England. Cosker spent the next couple of winters touring with the England A squad to East Africa, Sri Lanka, South Africa and Zimbabwe.

Cosker won his county cap in 2000 and became a key member of Glamorgan's highly successful one-day team between 2000 and 2005, where his accurate bowling, often in tandem with Robert Croft, and fielding backward of square on the off side were key to Glamorgan's success.

In September 2013, as new contract negotiations stalled, Cosker claimed his 500th first-class wicket for Glamorgan.

In August 2016 Cosker announced his retirement from cricket. In 2017 he was appointed by the England and Wales Cricket Board as a cricket liaison officer.

Career best performances
as of 18 August 2016

References

External links
 

1978 births
Living people
English cricketers
Glamorgan cricketers
Marylebone Cricket Club cricketers
NBC Denis Compton Award recipients
People educated at Millfield